HK Lido Nafta Riga was an ice hockey team in Riga, Latvia. They played in the Latvian Hockey League and the Latvian Second League from 1994-2001.

History
The club was founded in 1994, and took part in the Latvian Second Hockey League (Pirmā līga), which they won in 1996, and were thus promoted to the Latvian Hockey League. The club then took part in the LHL, which they finished second in 1998, 1999, and 2000. In 2001, the club finished in third place, and folded after the season.

Notable players
 Agris Saviels
 Mārtiņš Karsums
 Edgars Masaļskis
 Sergejs Povecerovskis
 Lauris Dārziņš
 Leonīds Beresņevs

References

Ice hockey teams in Riga
Ice hockey clubs established in 1994
Sports clubs disestablished in 2001
Defunct ice hockey teams in Latvia
Latvian Hockey League teams